Georgiev is a Bulgarian surname that is derived from the male given name Georgi and literally means Georgi's. It may refer to:

 Alexander Georgiev (born 1975), Russian draughts player
 Alexandar Georgiev (born 1996), Bulgarian–Russian professional ice hockey player
 Blagoy Georgiev (born 1981), Bulgarian footballer
 Boris Georgiev (born 1982), Bulgarian amateur boxer
 Boris Georgiev di Varna
 Damyan Georgiev (born 1950), Bulgarian footballer and coach
 Daniel Georgiev (born 1982), Bulgarian footballer
 Evlogi Georgiev (1819–1897), Bulgarian merchant, banker and benefactor
 Galin Georgiev (born 1969), Bulgarian triple jumper
 Georgi Georgiev (born 1963), Bulgarian footballer
 Georgi Georgiev (born 1988), Bulgarian footballer
 Georgi Georgiev (born 1976), Bulgarian judoka
 Georgi Georgiev, Bulgarian musician
 Georgi Georgiev-Getz (1926–1996), Bulgarian actor
 Grisha Georgiev
 Hristo Georgiev, Bulgarian canoeist
 Hristo Georgiev, Bulgarian patron
 Ivo Georgiev (1972–2021), Bulgarian footballer
 Kimon Georgiev (1882–1969), Bulgarian general and prime minister
 Kiril Georgiev (born 1965), Bulgarian chess player
 Krum Georgiev (born 1958), Bulgarian chess player
 Stanislav Georgiev (born 1971), Bulgarian runner
 Stoyan Georgiev (born 1986), Bulgarian footballer
 Valeri Georgiev (born 1984), Bulgarian footballer
 Vladimir Georgiev, Bulgarian chess player
 Vladimir Georgiev, Bulgarian linguist, philologist, educational administrator
 Vlado Georgiev (born 1977), Montenegrin singer, composer and songwriter
 Dimitar Popgeorgiev (1840–1907), Bulgarian revolutionary from Macedonia

See also
 Georgievski
 George (given name)

Bulgarian-language surnames
Patronymic surnames
Surnames from given names